Anna Dreimane (born July 4, 1997) is a Latvian basketball player for Colorado State Rams and the Latvian national team.

She participated at the EuroBasket Women 2017.

References

1997 births
Living people
Latvian women's basketball players
Basketball players from Riga
Centers (basketball)
Latvian expatriate basketball people in the United States
Colorado State Rams women's basketball players